

 Commissariat Point  is a locality in the Australian state of South Australia located on the east coast of the Eyre Peninsula overlooking Spencer Gulf about  north north-west of the state capital of Adelaide and about  south of the municipal seat in Port Augusta.

Its boundaries were created in 1994 for “the long established name” which is derived from the nearby headland of the same name.  The locality includes the former Commissariat Point Shack Site.

Commissariat Point is bounded on its western side by a road named Shack Road which extends from Port Augusta West in the north along the coast with Spencer Gulf to the locality of Blanche Harbor and to localities in the south within the City of Whyalla.  As of 2012, the southern end of the locality was zoned specifically for residential development intended for use as holiday accommodation.  The land to the immediate west of Commissariat Point is located within the locality of Cultana which is fully occupied by the Cultana Training Area, a military training area used by the Australian Army.

Commissariat Point is located within the federal division of Grey, the state electoral district of Stuart and the local government area of the City of Port Augusta.

Some famous people who holiday here include Mark Ricciuto (Adelaide Crows footballer), Laura Packard (Australian netballer), Andrew Costello (South Aussie with Cosi) and Grant Baker (Junior Australian Tennis Player and Club Doctor for the Glenelg Football Club).  
Outback artist Jack Absolom

Towns in South Australia
Eyre Peninsula
Far North (South Australia)